The 1979 Allan Cup was the Canadian senior ice hockey championship for the 1978–79 senior "A" season. The event was hosted by the Petrolia Squires in Sarnia, Ontario. The 1979 playoff marked the 71st time that the Allan Cup has been awarded.

Teams
Petrolia Squires (Eastern Canadian Champions)
Steinbach Huskies (Western Canadian Champions)

Best-of-Seven Series
Petrolia Squires 6 - Steinbach Huskies 5
Petrolia Squires 7 - Steinbach Huskies 6 (OT)
Steinbach Huskies 5 - Petrolia Squires 4
Petrolia Squires 7 - Steinbach Huskies 1
Petrolia Squires 6 - Steinbach Huskies 1

External links
Allan Cup archives 
Allan Cup website

Allan Cup